Trimethylglycine is an amino acid derivative that occurs in plants. Trimethylglycine was the first betaine discovered; originally it was simply called betaine because, in the 19th century, it was discovered in sugar beets.

Medical uses 
Betaine, sold under the brand name Cystadane among others, is indicated for the adjunctive treatment of homocystinuria, involving deficiencies or defects in cystathionine beta-synthase (CBS), 5,10-methylene-tetrahydrofolate reductase (MTHFR), or cobalamin cofactor metabolism (cbl).

The most common side effect is elevated levels of methionine in the blood.

Structure and reactions 

Trimethylglycine is an N-methylated amino acid. It is a zwitterion as the molecule contains both a quaternary ammonium group and a carboxyl group. The carboxyl group will be partially protonated in aqueous solution below pH 4, that is, approximately below pH equal to (pKa + 2).

 (aq) +    (aq)

Demethylation of trimethylglycine gives dimethylglycine.

Production and biochemical processes
Processing sucrose from sugar beets yields glycine betaine as a byproduct. The economic value of the trimethylglycine rivals that of the sugar content in sugar beets.

Biosynthesis 
In most organisms, glycine betaine is biosynthesized by oxidation of choline in two steps. The intermediate, betaine aldehyde, is generated by the action of the enzyme mitochondrial choline oxidase (choline dehydrogenase, EC 1.1.99.1). Betaine aldehyde is further oxidised in the mitochondria in mice to betaine by the enzyme betaine-aldehyde dehydrogenase (EC 1.2.1.8). In humans betaine aldehyde activity is performed by a nonspecific cystosolic aldehyde dehydrogenase enzyme (EC 1.2.1.3)

Biological function 
Trimethylglycine is an organic osmolyte. Sugar beet was cultivated from sea beet, which requires osmolytes in order to survive in the salty soils of coastal areas. Trimethylglycine also occurs in high concentrations (~10 mM) in many marine invertebrates, such as crustaceans and molluscs. It serves as a potent appetitive attractant to generalist carnivores such as the predatory sea slug Pleurobranchaea californica.

Trimethylglycine is an important cofactor in methylation, a process that occurs in every mammalian cell donating methyl groups (–CH3) for other processes in the body. These processes include the synthesis of neurotransmitters such as dopamine and serotonin. Methylation is also required for the biosynthesis of melatonin and the electron transport chain constituent coenzyme Q10, as well as the methylation of DNA for epigenetics.

The major step in the methylation cycle is the remethylation of homocysteine, a compound which is naturally generated during demethylation of the essential amino acid methionine. Despite its natural formation, homocysteine has been linked to inflammation, depression, specific forms of dementia, and various types of vascular disease. The remethylation process that detoxifies homocysteine and converts it back to methionine can occur via either of two pathways. The pathway present in virtually all cells involves the enzyme methionine synthase (MS), which requires vitamin B12 as a cofactor, and also depends indirectly on folate and other B vitamins. The second pathway (restricted to liver and kidney in most mammals) involves betaine-homocysteine methyltransferase (BHMT) and requires trimethylglycine as a cofactor. During normal physiological conditions, the two pathways contribute equally to removal of homocysteine in the body. Further degradation of betaine, via the enzyme dimethylglycine dehydrogenase produces folate, thus contributing back to methionine synthase. Betaine is thus involved in the synthesis of many biologically important molecules, and may be even more important in situations where the major pathway for the regeneration of methionine from homocysteine has been compromised by genetic polymorphisms such as mutations in the MS gene.

Trimethylglycine is produced by some cyanobacteria. Gabbay-Azaria et al 1988 uses C nuclear magnetic resonance to detect trimethylglycines produced by halophilic cyanobacteria. They find it is providing partial protection for their enzymes, against inhibition by NaCl and KCl.

Agriculture and aquaculture
Factory farms supplement fodder with trimethylglycine and lysine to increase livestock's muscle mass (and, therefore, "carcass yield", the amount of usable meat).

Salmon farms apply trimethylglycine to relieve the osmotic pressure on the fishes' cells when workers transfer the fish from freshwater to saltwater.

Trimethylglycine supplementation decreases the amount of adipose tissue in pigs; however, research in human subjects has shown no effect on body weight, body composition, or resting energy expenditure.

Nutrition 
Nutritionally, betaine is not needed when sufficient dietary choline is present for synthesis. Dietary betaine can partially, but not fully, substitute for choline. When insufficient betaine is available, elevated homocysteine levels and decreased SAM levels in blood occur. Supplementation of betaine in this situation would resolve these blood marker issues, but not compensate for other functions of choline.

Dietary supplement 
Although trimethylglycine supplementation decreases the amount of adipose tissue in pigs, research on human subjects has shown no effect on body weight, body composition, or resting energy expenditure when used in conjunction with a low calorie diet. The US Food and Drug Administration (FDA) approved betaine trimethylglycine (also known by the brand name Cystadane) for the treatment of homocystinuria, a disease caused by abnormally high homocysteine levels at birth. Trimethylglycine is also used as the hydrochloride salt (marketed as betaine hydrochloride or betaine HCl). Betaine hydrochloride was once permitted in over-the-counter (OTC) drugs as a gastric aid in the United States. US Code of Federal Regulations, Title 21, Section 310.540, which became effective in November 1993, banned betaine hydrochloride from being used in OTC products due to insufficient evidence to classify it as "generally recognized as safe and effective".

Trimethylglycine supplementation may cause diarrhea, stomach upset, or nausea. Trimethylglycine supplementation lowers homocysteine but also raises LDL-cholesterol in obese individuals and renal patients.

Other uses

Polymerase chain reaction 
Trimethylglycine can act as an adjuvant of the polymerase chain reaction (PCR) process, and other DNA polymerase-based assays such as DNA sequencing. By an unknown mechanism, it aids in the prevention of secondary structures in the DNA molecules, and prevents problems associated with the amplification and sequencing of GC-rich regions. Trimethylglycine makes guanosine and cytidine (strong binders) behave with thermodynamics similar to those of thymidine and adenosine (weak binders). It has been determined under experiment that it is best used at a final concentration of 1 M.

Medical research 
Laboratory studies and two clinical trials have indicated that trimethylglycine is a potential treatment of non-alcoholic steatohepatitis.

Trimethylglycine has been proposed as a treatment for depression. In theory, it would increase S-adenosylmethionine (SAMe) by remethylating homocysteine. The same homocysteine-to-methionine result could be achieved by supplementing with folic acid and vitamin B12, methionine then serving as a precursor to synthesis of SAMe. SAMe as a dietary supplement has been shown to work as a nonspecific antidepressant.

References

External links 
 
 USDA Database for the Choline Content of Common Foods – including the data on choline metabolites, such as betaine, in 434 food items.

Amino acid derivatives
Amino acids
Food additives
Orphan drugs
Quaternary ammonium compounds
Zwitterions